Attore North, also known as Attore Angadi, or just Attore, is part of Kolazhy grama panchayat, in Puzhakkal block, in Thrissur taluk, in Thrissur district.

Attore North is where the settlement originated and constituted the main village, hence the name, "Attore angadi" (meaning "Attore village").

Attore North is included in Pottore Census Town and served by Pottore (Mulagunnathukavu) post office, PIN 680581.

History
Present day Attore North, in ancient times, was then part of Vijayapuram "pravrithi" in Trichur "taluq" and known as Attore "desam".

Oldest reference to the name "Attore" can be found in the 1788 publication "Memoir of a map of Hindoostan" by James Rennell.

References

Cities and towns in Thrissur district
Villages in Thrissur district